North Adams may refer to:

 North Adams, Massachusetts
 North Adams, Michigan